Arif Mohammad Khan (born 18 November 1951) is an Indian politician belonging to the Bharatiya Janata Party (BJP). He was originally a member of the Indian National Congress, but resigned after the Congress party's U-turn on the Shah Bano case.
He is currently the Governor of Kerala. He is a former Union Minister. He has held several portfolios ranging from energy to civil aviation.

Early life and education
Arif Mohammad Khan was born on 18 November 1951 in Bulandshahr. He was educated at Jamia Millia School, Delhi, Aligarh Muslim University, Aligarh and at Shia College, Lucknow University.

Political career
Khan started his political career as a student leader. He was the President of Aligarh Muslim University Students' Union in the year 1972-73 and also its honorary Secretary a year earlier (1971–72). He contested the first legislative assembly election from Siyana constituency of Bulandshahar on Bharatiya Kranti Dal party's banner but was defeated. He became a member of the legislative assembly of UP in 1977 at the age of 26.

Khan joined the Indian National Congress party and was elected to the Lok Sabha in 1980 from Kanpur and 1984 from Bahraich. In 1986, he quit the Indian National Congress due to differences over the passage of Muslim Personal Law Bill which was piloted by Rajiv Gandhi in the Lok Sabha. He was against the legislation to enable Muslim men to avoid giving their divorced wife or wives any maintenance after the iddah period as per the Quran and resigned because of differences with Rajiv Gandhi on this issue. Khan joined the Janata Dal and was re-elected to the Lok Sabha in 1989. During the Janata Dal rule Khan served as union Minister of Civil aviation and Energy. He left the Janata Dal to join the Bahujan Samaj Party and again entered the Lok Sabha in 1998 from Bahraich. Khan held ministerial responsibilities from 1984 to 1990. In 2004, he joined the Bharatiya Janata Party (BJP) and unsuccessfully contested the Lok Sabha election as a BJP candidate that year from Kaiserganj constituency. Later BJP appointed Arif as the new Governor of Kerala.

Jain Hawala Case
Journalist Sanjay Kapoor, in his book "Bad Money, Bad Politics" has revealed that, Khan received an amount of 7 crores of Hawala money. As per the CBI charge sheet, he was paid this amount of money when he was Union Minister but he was later acquitted in the case.

Political views

Reformation in Islam
Arif Mohammad Khan has always supported reformation within Muslims. He resigned from position of Minister of state protesting against Rajiv Gandhi Congress Government stand on Shah Bano case in 1986. He defended Supreme Court judgment on Shah Bano case in Parliament. Khan opposed triple talaq in India and said that it should be punishable with 3 years in jail. Khan has asserted that Muslim men are still allowed to be polygamous and can also give a divorce easily by paying paltry sums.

Khan welcomed the Karnataka High Court's judgement upholding that the hijab is not an essential garment according to Islam during the 2022 Karnataka hijab row, stating that enforcing the wearing of a hijab is a conspiracy to push back Muslim females into the four walls of their homes and reduce their career prospects - he gave an example of imagining a female IPS officer who is responsible for controlling law and order in a district, who cannot do so wearing a hijab.

On being asked for a reaction about the murder of Kanhaiya Lal in Udaipur by reporters, Khan responded that madrasas teach that blasphemy should be punished by beheading and demanded that what is taught there should be examined.

Current activities
Khan has been deeply involved in writing since his student days. He is the author of the best selling book of the year 2010 Text and Context: Quran and Contemporary Challenges, published by Rupa & Co. Now Arif Mohammad Khan is actively involved in writing articles and columns related to Islam and Sufism. He has advocated abolishing of All India Muslim Personal Law Board. Arif Mohammad Khan also supported the Supreme Court of India's judgment in Shah Bano case to make the right to maintenance of a divorced Muslim wife absolute.

Governor of Kerala (2019 - present)
Khan was appointed the Governor of Kerala on 1 September 2019 by the order of the President of India, Ram Nath Kovind. He took charge as Governor on 6 September 2019 from P. Sathasivam. The latest political controversy regarding the appointment of Vice chancellors of universities of Kerala has put him in the spotlight.

See also
The Muslim Women (Protection of Rights on Divorce) Act 1986
Shah Bano case
Mukhtar Abbas Naqvi
Nighat Abbass
Syed Zafar Islam
Tahir Aslam Gora
Tarek Fatah

References

Sources
Parliament of India profile

|-

|-

|-

|-

Indian Muslims
Aligarh Muslim University alumni
University of Lucknow alumni
People from Bulandshahr
Living people
1951 births
V. P. Singh administration
Lok Sabha members from Uttar Pradesh
People from Bahraich district
India MPs 1980–1984
India MPs 1984–1989
India MPs 1989–1991
India MPs 1998–1999
Civil aviation ministers of India
Indian National Congress politicians
Janata Dal politicians
Bharatiya Janata Party politicians from Uttar Pradesh
Bahujan Samaj Party politicians from Uttar Pradesh
Politicians from Kanpur
Ministers of Power of India